Claudius Iohannes Labib (1868–1918) was a Coptic Egyptian Egyptologist. His family was known for copying church books. He used to accompany his father to the Al-Mouharak Monastery to learn Coptic with the monks. He was the youngest of three brothers, the eldest being Pahor and the middle being Tadros. Labib learned Egyptian hieroglyphs from the French Egyptologists and was the second modern Egyptian to learn this ancient language (the first was Ahmad Kamal and Ahmad Kamal is of Turkish origin). Claudius Labib is credited for making the first Coptic-Arabic Dictionary. He died before finishing it. Claudius Labib was the chief editor of "On" (Heliopolis) magazine which had articles written in Coptic. He also pioneered educational books for children named ⲁϧⲱⲙⲫⲁⲧ (Akhomphat). 

Claudius Labib was also responsible for editing a series of religious texts used by the Coptic Orthodox Church. The works were published at Cairo as follows: Katamãrus, 1900–02; Euchologion, 1904; Funeral Service, 1905.

References

External links
The Coptist: Claudius Labib – short biography and bibliography

1868 births
1918 deaths
Coptologists
Coptic language
Coptic Orthodox Christians from Egypt
Egyptian lexicographers
Egyptian Egyptologists
People from Asyut Governorate